Japarkuchi is an urban locality in Nalbari district, Assam, India. As per the 2011 Census of India, Japarkuchi has a population of 4,626 people including 2331 males and 2295 females, with a literacy rate of 87.44%.

References 

Villages in Nalbari district